The George Foster Peabody Awards (or simply Peabody Awards or the Peabodys) program, named for the American businessman and philanthropist George Peabody, honor the most powerful, enlightening, and invigorating stories in television, radio, and online media. The awards were conceived by the National Association of Broadcasters in 1938 as the radio industry's equivalent of the Pulitzer Prizes. Programs are recognized in seven categories: news, entertainment, documentaries, children's programming, education, interactive programming, and public service. Peabody Award winners include radio and television stations, networks, online media, producing organizations, and individuals from around the world.

Established in 1940 by a committee of the National Association of Broadcasters, the Peabody Award was created to honor excellence in radio broadcasting. It is the oldest major electronic media award in the United States. Final Peabody Award winners are selected unanimously by the program's Board of Jurors.
Reflecting excellence in quality storytelling, rather than popularity or commercial success, Peabody Awards are distributed annually to 30 out of 60 finalists culled from more than 1,000 entries. Because submissions are accepted from a wide variety of sources and styles, deliberations seek "Excellence On Its Own Terms".

Each entry is evaluated on the achievement of standards established within its own context. Entries, for which a  fee ( for radio) is required, are self-selected by those making submissions.

History
In 1938, the National Association of Broadcasters formed a committee to recognize outstanding achievement in radio broadcasting. Committee member Lambdin Kay, public-service director for WSB radio in Atlanta, Georgia, at the time, is credited with creating the award, named for businessman and philanthropist George Foster Peabody, who donated the funds that made the awards possible. Fellow WSB employee Lessie Smithgall introduced Lambdin to John E. Drewry, of the University of Georgia's Henry W. Grady College of Journalism and Mass Communication, who endorsed the idea. The Peabody Award was established in 1940 with the Grady College of Journalism as its permanent home.

The Peabody Awards were originally issued only for radio programming, but television awards were introduced in 1948. In the late 1990s additional categories for material distributed via the World Wide Web were added. Materials created solely for theatrical motion picture release are not eligible.

Peabody judging
The Peabody Awards judging process changed in 2014. Previously, more than 1,000 entries were evaluated by some 30 committees composed of a number of faculty, staff, and students from the University of Georgia and other higher education institutions across the country. Each committee was charged with screening or listening to a small number of entries and delivering written recommendations to the Peabody Board of Jurors, a ~17-member panel of scholars, critics, and media-industry professionals. Beginning in 2015, the preliminary round of judging is done by faculty members at major research universities across the United States, most of which are not at UGA. The 18-member Board of Jurors selects the nominees and winners each year. Board members discuss recommended entries as well as their own selections at three intensive preliminary meetings. The Board convenes at the University of Georgia in early April for final screenings and deliberations. Each entrant is judged on its own merit, and only unanimously selected programs receive a Peabody Award. For many years, there was no set number of awards issued. However, in 2016 the program instituted the Peabody 30, representing the best programs out of a field of 60 nominees. Prior to this, the all-time record for Peabody Award recipients in a single year was 46 in 2013.

Key people

George Foster Peabody (1852–1938), namesake of the awards, was a highly successful investment banker who devoted much of his fortune to education and social enterprise. 
Lambdin Kay was the awards chairman for the National Association of Broadcasters when he was asked to create a prize to honor the nation's premier radio programs and performances.
John E. Drewry (1902–1983) was the first dean of the University of Georgia's Henry W. Grady College of Journalism and Mass Communication. He accepted the position of dean when it was created in 1940. That same year he helped Lambdin Kay, general manager of Atlanta's WSB Radio, create the Peabody Awards recognizing excellence in broadcasting.
Dr. Worth McDougald (1926–2007) served as director of the Peabody Awards program from 1963 until his retirement in 1991.
Barry Sherman (1952–2000) was the director of the George Foster Peabody Awards program at the University of Georgia from 1991 until his death in 2000.
Horace Newcomb held the Lambdin Kay Chair for the Peabodys in the Grady College of Journalism and Mass Communication at the University of Georgia from 2001 to 2013.
Jeffrey P. Jones succeeded Horace Newcomb in July 2013 as the Lambdin Kay Chair for the Peabodys in the Grady College of Journalism and Mass Communication at the University of Georgia.

Award announcements and ceremonies
Each spring, the Peabody Awards Board of Jurors announce award recipients for work released during the previous year. Traditionally, the winners' announcements have been made via a simple press release and/or a press conference.    An April 2014 segment of CBS This Morning included an announcement of 2013 Peabody winners. In April 2015, the 2014 Peabodys were revealed over an 8-day period, with the entertainment-based recipients revealed on ABC's Good Morning America.

Formal presentation of the Peabody Awards is traditionally held in late May or early June. For many years, the awards were given during a luncheon in New York City. The ceremony moved to a red carpet evening event for the first time on May 31, 2015, with Fred Armisen serving as host. Several famous names have served as Peabody Awards ceremony hosts over the years, among them Walter Cronkite, Lesley Stahl, Jackie Gleason, Jon Stewart, Morley Safer, Craig Ferguson, Larry King, and Ira Glass. From 2014 to 2016, the Peabody Awards aired on a tape-delayed basis on the TV channel Pivot. On June 2, 2017, a television special of the 76th Annual Peabody Awards Ceremony was broadcast on both PBS and FUSION networks.

Peabody Awards Archive
The Peabody Awards Collection is the flagship of The Walter J. Brown Media Archive & Peabody Awards Collection. The archives are housed in the Richard B. Russell Building Special Collections Libraries on the north campus of The University of Georgia. The mission of the Peabody Archive is to preserve, protect, and provide access to the moving image and sound materials that reflect the collective memory of broadcasting and the history of the state of Georgia and its people. The collection contains nearly every entry for the first major broadcast award given in the United States. Entries began in 1940 for radio and 1948 for television, and at least 1,000 new entries are received every year—programs created by local, national, and international producers. The collection provides a cultural cross-section of television from its infancy to the present day, featuring news, documentary, entertainment, educational, and children's programming. Once judging is complete, all entries are moved to the Main Library for in-depth cataloging, access, and long-term preservation.

In 2017 the Walter J. Brown Media Archives & Peabody Awards Collection at the University of Georgia (BMA) and WGBH, on behalf of the American Archive of Public Broadcasting, were awarded a grant from the National Historical Publications and Records Commission to digitize, preserve, and provide access to approximately 4,000 hours of public broadcasting programming nominated for a George Foster Peabody Award between 1941 and 1999. The full collection will eventually comprise 4,000 digitized hours of audio and video recordings from 230 local, state, and regional public broadcasting stations in 46 states as well as Puerto Rico and the District of Columbia.

See also

 List of American television awards
 List of Peabody Award winners (1940–1949)
 List of Peabody Award winners (1950–1959)
 List of Peabody Award winners (1960–1969)
 List of Peabody Award winners (1970–1979)
 List of Peabody Award winners (1980–1989)
 List of Peabody Award winners (1990–1999)
 List of Peabody Award winners (2000–2009)
 List of Peabody Award winners (2010–2019)
 List of Peabody Award winners (2020–2029)

References

External links

Peabody Awards official website
 
 

 
1940 establishments in Georgia (U.S. state)
American journalism awards
American radio awards
American television awards
Awards established in 1940
Broadcast journalism
Educational media awards
Podcasting awards
University of Georgia
Web awards